HIEW, sometimes given as Hiew, (short for Hacker's view) is a console hex editor for Windows written by Eugene Suslikov (sen).  Amongst its feature set is its ability to view files in text, hex and disassembly mode.  The program is particularly useful for editing executable files such as COFF, PE, or ELF executable files.

Features

Hiew's features include:
 Built-in x86, x86-64 and ARMv6 assembler and disassembler.
 Pattern searching in hex/text/disassembler mode.
 Support for NE, LE, LX, PE and little-endian ELF executable formats.
 Built-in 64-bit calculator.
 Supports files of arbitrary length.
 Support for working with files and physical disks
 Functionality can be extended via exposed API with Hiew External Modules support.

Sources

External links

Hex editors